The Story of Han Xiangzi is a 17th-century Chinese novel written by . It is written in vernacular Chinese. The protagonist is Han Xiangzi, one of the Eight Immortals. The novel was written with a clear Daoist message.

The novel has been translated in full to English by Philip Clart.

References

17th-century Chinese novels
Ming dynasty novels